Consort Yeo (1393–1413) was an imperial concubine of the Yongle Emperor.  

She was from Korea. She became a member of the imperial harem of the Yongle Emperor in 1409. In 1410, the emperor's favorite concubine, Consort Gongxianxian, died. In 1413, Lady Yeo was arrested on order of the emperor, accused of having murdered Consort Gongxianxian by use of poison. She was tortured to death for murder. All her eunuchs and maids were executed as accomplices as well.

Titles
 During the reign of the Hongwu Emperor (r. 1368–1398):
 Lady Yeo (여씨, 呂氏) (from 1393)
 During the reign of the Yongle Emperor (r. 1402–1424):
 Gong-nyeo (공녀, 貢女) (from 1409)
 Lady of Handsome Fairness (婕妤; from 1409)

References 

1393 births
1413 deaths
Consorts of the Yongle Emperor